A Study in Sorcery is an alternate history novel by Michael Kurland featuring Randall Garrett's fictional detective character Lord Darcy. It was first published in paperback by Ace Books in 1989.

The Lord Darcy stories are set in an alternate world whose history supposedly diverged from our own during the reign of King Richard the Lionheart, in which King John never reigned and most of western Europe and the Americas are united in an Angevin Empire whose continental possessions were never lost by that king. In this world a magic-based technology has developed in place of the science of our own world.

Plot summary
In New England (a term which in this history includes the whole of our North America) an Azteque Prince is found dead on a stone altar.

Lord Darcy and Sean O Lochlainn are sent across the Atlantic to investigate. Darcy must identify the killer and determine whether the Azteques are returning to human sacrifice. Perhaps an attempt is being made by the rival Polish Empire to upset the balance of power between the Angevin Empire and the Azteques?

External links
Michael Kurland

1989 American novels
Lord Darcy novels
Novels by Michael Kurland
Alternate history novels
Ace Books books